Keith Alan "KB" Brantly (born May 23, 1962) is an American former professional long-distance runner who contended in the men's marathon at the 1996 Summer Olympic Games in Atlanta, Georgia. Brantly finished twenty-eighth of one hundred and eleven runners who completed the race, in a time of 2:18:17. He is recognized for his extensive distance-running career that encompasses nearly three decades at distances that range from one mile to a marathon.

He graduated from the University of Florida with a bachelor's degree in exercise and sports science in 1986, and was later inducted into the University of Florida Athletic Hall of Fame as a "Gator Great."

Running career

High school (1976-1980)
When Brantly was at Winter Haven High School in 1976, he joined the cross-country team, coached by Buck Dawson. Dawson is a member of Morehead State University Hall of Fame who later went to coach high school cross-country and track in 1979 where he guided two runners to be future Olympians.  When Brantly's running career soared as an individual in the fall of his senior year during the cross-country season, Dawson saw the potential he held. Brantly and one of his most memorable competitors, Basil Magee from Largo High School, challenged each other in multiple encounters such as the 1979 Astronaut Invitational and the 1979 Winter Haven Invitational, with Brantly falling just seconds behind Magee in both encounters. Towards the seasons end, there were two teams preparing for battle at the cross-country state championships in DeLand, Florida, Largo High School and Astronaut High School. All the while, Brantly was preparing for the title as champion. In the Florida class 4A High School State Cross Country Championships, Brantly (14:18) took an early lead to finally defeated Magee (14:30) in a rigorous five thousand meter footrace. Throughout the remainder of his senior year, Brantly and Magee grew closer in ability and competitiveness that carried into the spring track season. In 1980, Brantly would go to the Florida class 4A High School State Track Championships and win the 2-mile event in the time of 9:13. Brantly and Magee's competitive relationship did not stop at the state level, but at the national level where Magee (9:02) would outkick Brantly (9:03) at the 2-mile Postal Meet for the win.  
1979 - Florida Class 4A High School State Cross Country Champion (14:18)
1980 - Florida Class 4A High School Track and Field 2 mile Champion (9:13)

College (1980-1986)
Brantly attended the University of Florida in Gainesville, Florida, where he would run collegiate cross-country and track under Coach John Randolph. As a college student athlete, naturally, it was easy to get distracted and lazy Brantly said. Randolph helped instill the discipline that he lacked. During his time as a Gator, Brantly continued to thrive as a runner by winning two Southeastern Conference (SEC) 10,000 meter championships. In an interview he explains that these were no easy feat, “The University of Florida places a high emphasis on the SEC so winning was a very big deal.”  Winning at this level played a huge role in his running career because it would later aid him in his quest for the Olympic team.
1982 - SEC 10,000 m Champion (30:18.23)
1982 - 5th place in 2 mile at NCAA Indoor Championships (8:49.92)
1983 - SEC 10,000 m Champion (29:48.1)
1983 - 5th place in 10,000 m at NCAA Championships (29:45.95)
1983 - SEC Cross Country Champion
1984 - 7th place in 10,000 m at NCAA Championships (28:39.82)

After College (1986-1998) 
Following his collegiate
career with the Florida Gators, he was mentored by David Martin who compiled
his knowledge to transform him “from a talented runner to a seasoned competitor”
Brantly said. His competitive spirit and love for the sport continued to push
him to further distances. The furthest distances he competed in before were the
5,000 meters, the 10,000 meters and an eighteen-mile training run. Brantly
would run his first marathon (2:20:35) in Honolulu, Hawaii, and found that the
training for this distance alone was a challenge in itself. In the 1993 New York City Marathon, Brantly (2:12:51) continued to improve placing fifth behind
the elite marathoners. In the 1994 Boston Marathon (2:13:00), he trained to
finish in the top five but fell behind at the halfway point, finishing twentieth.

With years of experience
and failing to make the United States Olympic team twice in previous years,
Brantly's drive to make the team in 1996 was his main focus. At the 1996 Olympic
Trials Marathon, Brantly used his previous failed attempts and knowledge from
the New York and Boston Marathons to strategize making the team. “My strategy at
the 1996 Trials was to sit back, draft and stay warm until the final three
players became clear.” Brantly said. Paul Zimmerman led the race until the
fifteen mile marker where Bob Kempainen, Mark Coogan, and Keith Brantly would
take control for the final 10,000 meters. Brantly would finish in a time of
2:13:22 placing third and locking him into the US Olympic team. At the 1996
Summer Olympic Games in Atlanta, Georgia, Brantly gathered his thoughts and
strategies for the biggest stage an athlete can compete on. He finished
representing the United States in a time of 2:18:27 placing twenty-eighth.

Competition record

Personal records

See also
 Florida Gators
 List of University of Florida alumni
 List of University of Florida Athletic Hall of Fame members
 List of University of Florida Olympians

References
General
 Cohen, Gary. "Keith Brantly Interview." Garycohenrunning. 1 May 2009. Web. 25 Oct. 2015.  Keith Brantly at the 1998 Men's National Marathon Championship. Digital image. Brantly Running the Art and Science of Success. Keith Brantly, 2008. Web. 25 Oct. 2015.
http://www.garycohenrunning.com/Interviews/Brantly.aspx
"1979 National Team Championship "Largo HS, FL vs. Astronaut HS, FL" Read More: News - 1979 National Team Championship "Largo HS, FL vs. Astronaut HS, FL"" RunnerSpace.com. XCNATION.com, 30 Sept. 2013. Web. 25 Oct. 2015.
Kemp, Bill. "Winter Haven Coach Harry Wooddell to Be Inducted into Hall." (n.d.): n. pag. Polk Preps. 7 Jan. 2012. Web. 27 Oct. 2015.
Brown, Rick. "Polk Hall of Fame Welcomes Five Inductees." (n.d.): n. pag. The Ledger. 17 June 2008. Web. 27 Oct. 2015.
Specific

1962 births
Living people
American male long-distance runners
American male marathon runners
Athletes (track and field) at the 1996 Summer Olympics
Florida Gators men's cross country runners
Florida Gators men's track and field athletes
Olympic track and field athletes of the United States
Universiade medalists in athletics (track and field)
Universiade gold medalists for the United States